Michael Roberts (born 27 July 1959) is a former Australian rules footballer and now television sports journalist and reporter with the Nine Network and Triple M.

Football career 
Roberts was recruited from Beaumaris, Victoria, and is the son of former St Kilda Football Club great Neil Roberts. He made his debut with St Kilda in 1978, and went on to play 77 games and kick 45 goals until 1985. He then moved to the Richmond Football Club for one season in 1986, playing only 12 games and 4 goals. He made his final move to the Fitzroy Football Club for 1987, where he managed only 2 games and 1 goal. Roberts also represented Victoria in 1981.

Roberts returned to Beaumaris in 1999, presenting Michael Wilson with the Under 17 Best & Fairest award. He received a hero’s welcome at his former club, although many at the function believe the warmest applause was for Wilson.

Media career 
Following his retirement from football, Roberts became a respected commentator for the Nine Network. He was a regular sports reporter for National Nine News, as well as appearing as a boundary rider during the Nine Network's Australian Football League telecasts. Roberts also worked as a model on the television quiz show Sale of the Century. 

He can also be heard on Triple M's football coverage as a boundary rider on Saturday Nights and Sundays.

References

External links

Profile at Enterainoz

St Kilda Football Club players
Richmond Football Club players
Fitzroy Football Club players
Australian television presenters
Australian rules football commentators
1959 births
Living people
Australian rules footballers from Victoria (Australia)